Village Scenes, Sz. 78, BB 87a, also known as Falun, Dedinské scény, or its German title, Dorfszenen, is a collection of Slovak folk songs for female voice and piano by Hungarian composer Béla Bartók. It was completed in 1924.

Background 

Bartók, a composer primarily known for collecting and arranging folk music from central and eastern Europe, wrote this set of folk songs while on a project and journey around Europe that spanned several decades, starting around the 1900s. The folk tunes were collected in and around the Zólyom County area, which is in modern-day Slovakia, around 1915–6. It was finished in December 1924 in Budapest and dedicated to his second wife, Ditta. It was engraved and published under Universal Edition some years later, in 1927, along with many other song collections made in earlier years. It then faded into obscurity until Béla's son, Peter Bartók, revised and republished the piece in 1994, by examining both the published version and the manuscripts left behind by the composer together with scholars Eve Beglarian and Nelson Dellamaggiore.

Structure 

The set consists of five songs and has a total duration of around 12 minutes. It is scored for a female voice and piano. The entire set has been translated into English by Martin Lindsay, German by Benedikt Szabolcsi, and Hungarian by Viktor Lány. The movement list is as follows:

Arrangements 

Bartók wrote an arrangement of the last three songs of the set for a small choir of four to eight female voices and orchestra in 1926. This arrangement received the catalog numbers Sz. 79, BB 87b. It was completed in May 1926.

Recordings 

 Mezzo-soprano Klára Csordás and pianist Adrienne Krausz recorded this piece at the Festetics Palace, in June 1994. The recording was released on CD by Pyramid Records.

References

Footnotes 

1924 compositions
Song cycles by Béla Bartók
Slovak music